is a private university in Okayama, Okayama, Japan, established in 1964.  It is predominantly a school of science and engineering.

Notable events
From 2015–2018, Okayama University of Science's operator, the group Kake Gakuen, applied for permission to open a new school of veterinary medicine in Ehime Prefecture, across the water from Okayama on the island of Shikoku.  This school would be a branch of the Okayama University of Science.  The government's aid in sweeping away regulatory concerns and speeding the process ignited accusations of corruption, as Prime Minister Shinzo Abe was friends with the owner of Kake Gakuen, Kotaro Kake.

In 2020, another controversy broke out after it was revealed that all ethnically Korean students applying to the university's recently added school of veterinary medicine in October 2019 were denied and failed with scores of zero (out of fifty) on their entrance examination.

Notable people
Graduates:
 Yu Suzuki, an engineer and game programmer who worked for Sega and helped implement many of their famous video games
 Koji Mise, a baseball player for Okayama's college team that went on to the Nippon Professional Baseball league

Faculty:
 Akira Suzuki, a chemist and Nobel Prize laureate who served as a visiting professor for a year in the chemistry department, from 1994–1995
 Kent Gilbert, a gaijin tarento minor celebrity and proponent of revisionist far-right Japanese historiography that downplays Japanese war crimes in World War II

See also
 加計学園問題#関係者による発言, an article on the Kake Gakuen scandal

References

External links
 Official website 

Educational institutions established in 1964
Private universities and colleges in Japan
Okayama
Universities and colleges in Okayama Prefecture
1964 establishments in Japan
Kansai Collegiate American Football League